Sayada is a city in the Sahel region of Tunisia. It is located about fifteen kilometers south of Monastir. It is part of the administrative governorate of Monastir, and is the county seat of the Sayada-Lamta-Bou Hajar Delegation which has a population of 22,944.

Description
The built up area extends for over a mile in every direction from the hill but especially towards the flat tidal area.

Sayada is joined in a "delegation" with the smaller communities of Bouhjar and Lemta (which historically was known as Leptiminus and is still the site of international archaeology). Sayada itself is within the Monastir Governorate which administers the larger area from the city Monastir which is 12 miles inland.

Born here
 Rachid Ammar, Chief of Staff of the Tunisian Armed Forces
 Tahar Cheriaa, film critic and creator of the Carthage Film Festival 
 Naceur Ktari, award-winning film director

Notes

External links

Populated places in Monastir Governorate
Communes of Tunisia